The 18th Annual Helpmann Awards for live performance in Australia was held across two nights; the Curtain Raiser Ceremony on 15 July 2018 at the Sydney Town Hall and the Awards Ceremony on 16 July 2018 at the Capitol Theatre, Sydney. Nominations were announced on 18 June 2018.

Major recipients included dance work Bennelong (six awards including Best New Australian Work and Best Dance Production), musicals Beautiful (five awards including Best Musical) and Muriel's Wedding (five awards including Best Original Score), opera Hamlet (four awards including Best Opera), and play The Children (three awards including Best Play).

Recipients and nominations 
Nominees and winners of the 2018 Helpmann Awards were:

Theatre

Musicals

Opera and Classical Music

Dance and Physical Theatre

Contemporary Music

Other

Industry

Lifetime Achievement

References 

Helpmann Awards
Helpmann Awards
Helpmann Awards
Helpmann Awards
Helpmann Awards, 18th
Helpmann Awards